Tekapo River, flows occasionally through the Mackenzie Basin, Canterbury, in New Zealand's South Island,
 Lake Tekapo (town), small town (township) located at the southern end of the lake of the same name in the inland South Island of New Zealand.
 Lake Tekapo, the second-largest of three roughly parallel lakes running north–south along the northern edge of the Mackenzie Basin in the South Island of New Zealand
 Lake Tekapo Airport, Non-Certificated Airport 1.5 NM (2.8 km; 1.7 mi) west of Lake Tekapo township in the Mackenzie District of the South Island in New Zealand
 Tekapo Ridge, crescent-shaped chain of low peaks